Blåfjella–Skjækerfjella National Park lies in Trøndelag county, Norway. It is the third largest national park on the Norwegian mainland and one of the largest remaining true wilderness areas. It is located in the municipalities of Verdal, Snåsa, Grong, Lierne, and Steinkjer. The Sami people have lived in and used the area for several centuries. There are many Sami cultural monuments here, such as settlements, gathering places, burial sites, and sacred places.

The park offers good opportunities for hunting, fishing, and other outdoor recreation. The terrain is suitable for shooting ptarmigan and other small game, and there are a number of lakes with brown trout and char. There are many
paths to hike, some of which are marked, although not in the winter.  There are also a few mountain cabins available for overnight stays.

Lierne National Park is located just east of Blåfjella–Skjækerfjella National Park.

Flora and fauna
The park is known as the place where spruce was first introduced (migrated) to Norway. There is a large variation of nature types, including areas of undisturbed old-growth forest in the valleys. The flora includes both coastal species as well as more typical inland species, and alpine plants. The geology includes both soft bedrock good for plant growth as well as areas with very hard bedrock with much poorer plant life.

A total of 28 species of mammals and many species of birds have been observed in the park.  The rare Arctic fox and all the large predators in mainland Norway have been found here.  This includes brown bear, lynx, wolverines, and the gray wolf, although the wolf is only rarely seen.  There are also three species of deer present: moose, roe deer, and red deer. Four nature reserves are located adjacent to the park: Arvasslia Nature Reserve, Berglimyra and Klumplifjellet Nature Reserve, Gaundalsmyra Nature Reserve, and Storfloa Nature Reserve.

Name
The park was named Blåfjella-Skjækerfjella in 2004 when it was established.  Blåfjella means "the blue mountains" (-fjella is the finite plural of fjell which means "fell" or "mountain"). The first element in Skjækerfjella is the plural skjæker which means "shafts (of a wagon)" - here referring to long mountain ridges. Both names are most likely Norwegianizations of the Sami names on these mountain areas: Låarte and Skæhkere.

References

External links
 Map of Blåfjella-Skjækerfjella National Park

National parks of Norway
Protected areas established in 2004
Verdal
Snåsa
Grong
Lierne
Steinkjer
Tourist attractions in Trøndelag
Protected areas of Trøndelag
2004 establishments in Norway